The Laurence Olivier Award for Best Entertainment or Comedy Play is an annual award presented by the Society of London Theatre in recognition of achievements in commercial London theatre. The awards were established as the Society of West End Theatre Awards in 1976, and renamed in 1984 in honour of English actor and director Laurence Olivier.

The award was titled Comedy of the Year from its establishment in 1976 until 1990, was renamed to Best Comedy starting in 1991, Best New Comedy starting in 1999, then retitled to its current name for the 2020 Olivier Awards – when "Entertainment" was moved to join Best Comedy Play from the Best Entertainment and Family award, which was renamed Best Family Show at that same time.

Winners and nominees

1970s

1980s

1990s

2000s

2010s

2020s

See also
 Critics' Circle Theatre Award for Best New Play
 Evening Standard Theatre Award for Best Play
 Tony Award for Best Play

References

External links
 

Comedy